In molecular biology, Small nucleolar RNA SNORD31 (U31) is a member of the C/D class of snoRNA which contain the C (UGAUGA) and D (CUGA) box motifs. U31 is encoded within the U22 snoRNA host gene (UHG) in mammals and is thought to act as a 2'-O-ribose methylation guide for ribosomal RNA.

References

External links 
 

Small nuclear RNA